The London, Midland and Scottish Railway (LMS) Fowler 2-6-4T was a class of steam locomotive passenger tank engine designed by Henry Fowler.

Construction

125 examples of the class were built. The last 30 numbered 2395 to 2424 were fitted with side-windows and doors to their cabs. The LMS classified them 4P, BR 4MT. They were the basis for a family of subsequent LMS/BR Class 4 2-6-4T locomotives.  The Irish Northern Counties Committee (NCC) Class W 2-6-0 moguls were also strongly influenced by this class, albeit the driving wheel diameter was three inches greater to match the NCC practice.

Operational use
Most of the class were used on longer-distance commuter trains from stations in London, Manchester and other large towns.  A number were allocated to Tebay Motive Power Depot and were used to bank heavy passenger and goods trains up the steep incline to Shap on the LMS West Coast Main Line. Some operated on the long trip from Shrewsbury to Swansea (Victoria).  The last two surviving locos were withdrawn from service in 1966.
42389 was hauling the Tring to Euston commuter train that was hit in the rear at Harrow and Wealdstone on 8 October 1952 by a Perth to Euston express.  112 people died in the accident.  42389 was undamaged.

Numbering

The LMS numbered the class 2300–2424, BR adding 40000 to their numbers to make them 42300–424.

Preservation and revival 
No locos were preserved, but the January 2013 edition of The Railway Magazine reported that a new-build project to recreate a Fowler 2-6-4T was at an initial research stage.

In May 2015, the LMS-Patriot Project announced that after the completion of Patriot Class No. 45551 The Unknown Warrior, it would begin construction on a new-build Fowler 2-6-4T. Similar to the Patriot, it will carry the number of the last member of the class, No. 42424, and be built to main line running standards, though it will only primarily be used on heritage lines.

One of the NCC Class WT locos (No. 4), which drew heavily from the Fowler design and were the last steam locomotives withdrawn in Northern Ireland, is preserved by the Railway Preservation Society of Ireland. No. 4 returned from overhaul in June 2015 and is currently based in Dublin.

References 

 David Hunt, Bob Essery Fred James (2002) LMS Locomotive Profiles No. 3: The Parallel Boiler 2-6-4 Tank Engines 
 

2-6-4T locomotives
4 Fowler 2-6-4T
Railway locomotives introduced in 1927
Scrapped locomotives
Standard gauge steam locomotives of Great Britain
Passenger locomotives